Thomas Francis Michael McCarthy (July 24, 1863 –  August 5, 1922) was an American Major League Baseball player. He was elected to the Baseball Hall of Fame in 1946.

Career
McCarthy was born on July 24, 1863 in Boston, Massachusetts, the eldest son of Daniel and Sarah McCarthy. After graduating from South Boston's John A. Andrew Grammar School, McCarthy worked for a clothing company during the day and played baseball at night. In 1884 he went to work for a piano company, where he received $18 a week for work in their factory and play for the company baseball team. Later that year, McCarthy joined the Boston Reds in the Union Association as a starting pitcher and outfielder. In limited innings and at-bats, he played poorly, batting at a paltry .215 average, and lost all seven of his pitching appearances. McCarthy moved to the National League and played with the Boston Beaneaters the following season and the Philadelphia Quakers the following two years but failed to bat higher than .200 in any season, although in limited at-bats.

With the Browns until , McCarthy scored over 100 runs each season and grew increasingly productive at the plate. Although the shoddy record-keeping of the time prevents an accurate tally, he also asserted himself as a daring presence on the base-paths, by some accounts stealing over 100 bases in 1888 and approaching the mark in 1890.

In  he drove in over 100 runs for the first time in his career, a feat that he repeated in  while hitting 13 home runs. The press of the day called McCarthy and teammate Hugh Duffy the "Heavenly Twins". Their Boston team was one of the most successful clubs of the era. McCarthy played for the Brooklyn Bridegrooms in  before retiring. He finished his career with a .292 batting average, 44 home runs and roughly 500 stolen bases.

Post-playing career
After his playing career ended McCarthy, served as the head baseball coach at Holy Cross (1899–1900, 1904–1905, and 1916), Dartmouth (1906–1907), and Boston College (1920). He was also a scout for the Cincinnati Reds (1909–1912), Boston Braves (1913–1915) and Boston Red Sox (1920) and manager of the Newark Bears (1918). In 1921 he joined the Brooklyn Dodgers coaching staff.

In 1921, McCarthy had a severe attack of double pneumonia and was in critical condition. He recovered and traveled south for the winter. His health declined when he returned home and in June was diagnosed with cancer. He died on August 5, 1922.

Hall of Fame selection
McCarthy's selection into the Baseball Hall of Fame in 1946 has always been a controversial one due to his less than spectacular statistics, especially when compared to those of his fellow inductees and some players who have not yet been honored.

In his 2001 book, The New Bill James Historical Baseball Abstract, Sabermetrician Bill James makes the point that McCarthy was held in such high esteem because of his introduction of the "hit and run" play into the game. This play, among other novel strategies (such as batter to baserunner signals, etc.) that he and his Boston teammates utilized, were a clever and gentlemanly counter to the rough and tumble "Baltimore" style of play which was, at the time, giving baseball a bad name.  Nevertheless, in the same book, James also said that McCarthy is the worst right fielder in the Hall of Fame. As of 2014, McCarthy had the lowest Jaffe Wins Above Replacement Score of any player in the Hall of Fame.

According to SABR, McCarthy is also the only Union Association player elected to the Hall of Fame.

See also

 List of Major League Baseball career runs scored leaders
 List of Major League Baseball career stolen bases leaders
 List of Major League Baseball player-managers
 List of St. Louis Cardinals team records

References

External links

1863 births
1922 deaths
19th-century baseball players
Baseball players from Boston
Boston Beaneaters players
Boston Braves scouts
Boston College Eagles baseball coaches
Boston Reds (UA) players
Boston Red Sox scouts
Brockton (minor league baseball) players
Brooklyn Bridegrooms players
Cincinnati Reds scouts
Dartmouth Big Green baseball coaches
Haverhill (minor league baseball) players
Holy Cross Crusaders baseball coaches
Major League Baseball player-managers
Major League Baseball right fielders
Minor league baseball managers
National Baseball Hall of Fame inductees
Oshkosh (minor league baseball) players
Philadelphia Quakers players
Providence Grays (minor league) players
St. Louis Browns (AA) managers
St. Louis Browns (AA) players